Euagrus chisoseus is a species of mygalomorph spider in the family Euagridae. It is found in the United States and Mexico.

References

Euagridae
Articles created by Qbugbot
Spiders described in 1939
Spiders of North America